Ennio Boschini (1 July 1940 - 11 April 2009) was an Italian hammer thrower.

Achievements

National titles
Boschini won three national championships at individual senior level.

Italian Athletics Championships
Hammer throw: 1960, 1962, 1963 (3)

See also
 Italy at the 1963 Mediterranean Games

References

External links
 Almanacco del lancio del martello 

1940 births
2009 deaths
Italian male hammer throwers
Sportspeople from Padua
Athletics competitors of Fiamme Oro
Mediterranean Games bronze medalists for Italy
Mediterranean Games medalists in athletics
Athletes (track and field) at the 1963 Mediterranean Games